Statistics of the Yemeni League in the 1994–95 season.

Results

Other participants
Al-Wahda Aden
Al-Zohra Sanaa
Shamsan Aden
Al-Tilal Aden
Al-Shula Aden
Al-Sha'ab Hadramaut
Al-Ahly Hudaida

External links
 

Yem
Yemeni League seasons
football
football